The Haunted House is a 1913 American silent short comedy-drama film starring Julius Frankenburg, Harry Van Meter, Vivian Rich, and Jack Richardson, based on a story by Maie B. Havey (who also acted in silent films).

Actress Vivian Rich was a popular silent film star who retired in 1931 with the coming of sound (she died in a car crash in 1957). Jack Richardson went on to star in Son of Kong (1933) and The Climax (1944).

Plot
A young girl (Rich) is trying to choose the man she will marry, and challenges her beaus to compete for her hand. Whichever of them can spend a night in a haunted house will become her husband, but only one can win.

References

External links

1913 films
1913 comedy-drama films
1910s English-language films
American silent short films
American black-and-white films
American haunted house films
1913 comedy films
1913 drama films
Films directed by Lorimer Johnston
1910s American films
Silent horror films
Silent American comedy-drama films
Comedy-drama short films